La Salla is a 1996 computer animated short by Richard Condie, produced in Winnipeg by the National Film Board of Canada.

The film is a farcical comic opera, with a libretto written by Condie and translated into Italian, then recorded by Jay Brazeau.

The film was nominated for an Academy Award for Best Animated Short Film at the 69th Academy Awards. It also won the award for best animation film at the Vancouver International Film Festival.

Credits
 A Film by: Richard Condie
 Music & Sound Editing: Patrick Godfrey
 Baritone: Jay Brazeau
 Technical Coordinator: Scott Collins
 Studio Administrator: Cyndi Forcand
 Re-recording: Paul Sharpe
 Special Thanks To: Daniel Langlois and John Lasseter
 NFB Digital Imaging Services: Julie Dutrisac, Susan Gourley, Doris Kochanek
 Producers: Ches Yetman and Richard Condie
 Executive Producer: Ches Yetman
 La Salla - A National Film Board Of Canada Production
 Dolby Stereo® In Selected Theaters
 Dolby Surround™ Stereo On Videocassette
  © 1996 The National Film Board Of Canada

References

External links
Watch La Salla at NFB.ca

Computer-animated short films
1996 short films
National Film Board of Canada animated short films
Films directed by Richard Condie
Films about opera
1990s Italian-language films
Canadian comedy short films
1996 computer-animated films
1990s animated short films
Canadian animated short films
Quebec films
1996 films
1990s Canadian films